Shawmut Line can mean:

Pittsburg and Shawmut Railroad, also known as the Shawmut Line
Pittsburg, Shawmut and Northern Railroad, also known as the Shawmut Line
Shawmut Branch of the MBTA Red Line in Boston, Massachusetts, formerly the Shawmut Branch Railroad